Dover Township is one of the fourteen townships of Athens County, Ohio, United States. The 2010 census found 3,626 people in the township, 2,577 of whom lived in the unincorporated portions of the township.

Geography
Located in the northwestern part of the county, it borders the following townships:
Trimble Township - north
Homer Township, Morgan County - northeast corner
Ames Township - east
Canaan Township - southeast corner
Athens Township - south
Waterloo Township - southwest corner
York Township - west
Ward Township, Hocking County - northwest corner

Several populated places are located in Dover Township:
The village of Chauncey, in the center
Part of the census-designated place of The Plains, in the south
The unincorporated community of Millfield, in the north
The unincorporated community of Liars Corner, in the east

Much of the township is part of the Wayne National Forest.

Name and history
Dover Township was organized in 1811.

Statewide, other Dover Townships are located in Fulton, Tuscarawas, and Union counties.

Coal mining has historically been important in Dover Township, which was the site of the Millfield Mine disaster of 1930.

Government
The township is governed by a three-member board of trustees, who are elected in November of odd-numbered years to a four-year term beginning on the following January 1. Two are elected in the year after the presidential election and one is elected in the year before it. There is also an elected township fiscal officer, who serves a four-year term beginning on April 1 of the year after the election, which is held in November of the year before the presidential election. Vacancies in the fiscal officership or on the board of trustees are filled by the remaining trustees.

References

External links
County website

Townships in Athens County, Ohio
1811 establishments in Ohio
Populated places established in 1811
Townships in Ohio